Gaylussacia ursina, the bear huckleberry, is a plant species native to the southern Appalachians (Georgia, Tennessee, and the Carolinas).

Gaylussacia ursina is a shrub up to 200 cm (80 inches) tall, sometimes forming huge colonies. Flowers are in groups of 4–6, greenish-white. Fruits are black, sweet and juicy.

References

ursina
Flora of the Southeastern United States
Flora of the Appalachian Mountains
Berries
Plants described in 1843
Taxa named by Asa Gray
Taxa named by John Torrey
Taxa named by Moses Ashley Curtis